Terbium(III) fluoride is an inorganic compound with chemical formula TbF3. It is hard to dissolve in water. It can be produced by reacting terbium(III) carbonate and 40% hydrofluoric acid at 40°C.

Uses
Terbium(III) fluoride is used for producing metallic terbium.

2 TbF3 + 3 Ca → 3 CaF2 + 2 Tb

References

Terbium compounds
Fluorides
Lanthanide halides